Ashley Carty (born 17 July 1995) is a snooker player that will return to the professional tour in 2023, he is based in Thurcroft, Rotherham. He was the 2014 English Under-21 champion. He turned professional in May 2018 after qualifying from Q School Event 3. He won the QTour playoffs in March 2023. This earned him a new professional tour card for the 2023/24 and 2024/25 seasons.

Personal life
Carty combines playing snooker with his job as a sports coach.

Performance and rankings timeline

Career finals

Amateur finals: 2 (1 title)

References

External links
Ashley Carty at worldsnooker.com

English snooker players
Living people
Sportspeople from Rotherham
1995 births